Breweriana refers to articles containing a brewery or brand name, such as beer cans, beer bottles, bottle openers, beer labels, tin signs, beer mats, beer trays, beer tap, wooden cases and neon signs.

United States 
In the US, the National Association of Breweriana Advertising (NABA) was formed in 1972. NABA publishes The Breweriana Collector, a quarterly publication.  The term Breweriana is also utilized by other collector Associations, including The East Coast Breweriana Association and the American Breweriana Association.

The ABA National Brewery Museum & Research Library, at Potosi Brewing Company in Wisconsin, preserves the history of America's breweries with permanent and rotating displays of breweriana, from beer bottles and cans, glasses, coasters, advertising materials and other collectibles.

World wide 
The Brewery Collectibles World Convention was formed in Moutfort in 2012 by 16 collectors clubs. Today over 70 clubs are BCWC members.

World Conventions:
2013 in Martin, Slovakia
2015 in Milwaukee, USA
2017 in Tychy, Poland
2019 in La Plata, Argentina
2022 in Istanbul, Turkey

References

External links
Embossed Beer Bottle Collection
Beermat Mania - Interactive gallery of British Brewery Beermats
The American Breweriana Association
The ABA National Brewery Museum™ & Research Library
The National Association Breweriana Advertising

Beer advertising
Collecting
Drinkware